Carol Martin is an American journalist and long-time news anchor for WCBS-TV in New York.

Biography
Martin is the daughter of Idessa and Daniel Martin. Her father was an auto worker for General Motors Corporation in Detroit. She is a graduate of Wayne State University. In 1974, Martin accepted a position with WCBS-TV in New York first as a correspondent and then anchor. In 1994, she left WCBS to host the daily talk show America's Talking and then went to work for WBIS-TV in New York where she was the host of Money Style Power. She also worked on Dateline NBC and as a substitute host on Weekend Today. In 1997, she was named as the host of the second version of The People’s Court. In 2000, she was hired by the Fox news affiliate WNYW-TV in New York as co-anchor on the weekday newscast show Fox Five Live.

In 1993, she married Joseph "Joe" Terry, a television director for The Maury Povich Show in New York and the Oprah Winfrey Show in Chicago.

References

American women television journalists
Wayne State University alumni
Television anchors from New York City
Living people
Year of birth missing (living people)
21st-century American women